Charles Edward Sumner (October 19, 1930 – April 3, 2015) was an American football player who was selected by the Chicago Bears in the 22nd round of the 1954 NFL Draft. A 6'1", 194 lbs. safety from  the College of William & Mary, Sumner played in eight National Football League (NFL) seasons, from 1955 to 1962. He later was an assistant coach in the NFL for many years, including three stints with the Oakland/Los Angeles Raiders.

Sumner's only head coaching stint was with the Oakland Invaders of the United States Football League (USFL) in 1985.  That year, he led the Invaders, a club that featured future NFL stars Anthony Carter, Bobby Hebert, Ray Bentley and Gary Plummer, to the USFL Championship Game.  The 1985 USFL Championship game was the last game the league ever played. The Invaders lost to the Baltimore Stars, 28–24, at Giants Stadium.

Sumner was born in Radford, Virginia. He was inducted into the Virginia Sports Hall of Fame in 2007. He died in Maui, Hawaii on April 6, 2015.

References

1930 births
2015 deaths
American football safeties
Chicago Bears players
Minnesota Vikings players
New England Patriots coaches
Oakland Raiders coaches
Pittsburgh Steelers coaches
Sacramento Surge coaches
William & Mary Tribe football players
United States Football League coaches
People from Dublin, Virginia
People from Radford, Virginia
Players of American football from Virginia